Fernando Fonseca (born 29 December 1993) is a Brazilian professional footballer who plays as a defender.

References

External links
 

Living people
1993 births
Sportspeople from Paraná (state)
Brazilian footballers
Association football defenders
Liga MX players
Brazilian expatriate footballers
Brazilian expatriate sportspeople in Mexico
Expatriate footballers in Mexico